Pizos Bay (‘Zaliv Pizos’ \'za-liv 'pi-zos\) is the 10.65 km wide bay indenting for 9 km Nordenskjöld Coast in Graham Land, Antarctica northwest of Samotino Point and southeast of Porphyry Bluff. Part of Larsen Inlet, formed as a result of glacier retreat in the last decade of 20th century.

The feature is named after the ancient settlement of Pizos in southern Bulgaria.

Location
SCAR Antarctic Digital Database mapping in 2012.

Maps
Antarctic Digital Database (ADD). Scale 1:250000 topographic map of Antarctica. Scientific Committee on Antarctic Research (SCAR). Since 1993, regularly upgraded and updated.

References
 Pizos Bay. SCAR Composite Antarctic Gazetteer.
 Bulgarian Antarctic Gazetteer. Antarctic Place-names Commission. (details in Bulgarian, basic data in English)

External links
 Pizos Bay. Copernix satellite image

Bays of Graham Land
Nordenskjöld Coast
Bulgaria and the Antarctic